The 2000s in rock radio in the United States saw a continued blurring of the playlists among mainstream rock and alternative rock stations. Every track that was ranked by Billboard as the number-one song of the year on its Mainstream Rock Tracks chart during the decade was also a top-five hit on the Alternative Songs chart, most of which topped both charts. In June 2009, Billboard debuted the Rock Songs chart which combined the data of the two charts and its Triple A chart.

Two of the biggest artists on the Mainstream Rock chart during the 2000s not only had success on the Modern Rock/Alternative charts, but also crossed over into the realm of Top 40 pop music. The top mainstream rock song of the decade, "Kryptonite" by 3 Doors Down, peaked at No. 3 on the Hot 100 and was a No. 1 pop hit. The top mainstream rock artist of the decade was Nickelback, who had the second biggest song on the Mainstream Rock chart during the 2000s with "How You Remind Me" and led all other artists with seven number ones during the decade. "How You Remind Me" was ranked as the fourth biggest song on the decade-ending Billboard Hot 100 chart.

Number ones of the 2000s

 – Number-one song of the year

Notes

References

United States Mainstream Rock
Mainstream 2000s